Tom Riordan is an English civil servant. He has been Chief Executive of Leeds City Council since August 2010, and spent three months working part-time for the UK government from May 2020 leading the Contain strand within COVID-19 NHS Test and Trace programme, setting out the framework for managing local COVID-19 outbreaks.

Early life and education
Riordan was born and educated in Northallerton, North Yorkshire. He graduated in Modern History from Trinity College, Oxford University in 1989. He gained an MBA at Imperial College in 1997. Due to his parents' mental health problems, Riordan spent periods in care before the age of four, thereafter returning home.

Career
Riordan joined the UK civil service 'fast stream' graduate intake in 1990. He then specialised in environmental policy and represented the UK in international negotiations on climate change and endangered species. Riordan moved to Leeds in 1997 and helped set up Yorkshire Forward, the regional development agency for Yorkshire and Humber, becoming its chief executive in 2006, supporting 10,000 businesses during the recession, completing award-winning regeneration developments and pioneering low carbon initiatives.

Riordan was appointed Chief Executive of Leeds City Council in August 2010, and completed a handover period with outgoing chief Paul Rogerson.

Coronavirus
In May 2020 Riordan agreed to spend three months, part-time, leading the UK government COVID-19 tracing system.

Personal life
Riordan is married and has two children. He is a keen footballer and Middlesbrough F.C. supporter. He has experience of mental health issues in his wider family.

References 

Living people
Local government officers in England
Local government in Leeds
COVID-19 pandemic in the United Kingdom
Year of birth missing (living people)